Provanna lomana is a species of sea snail, a marine gastropod mollusk in the family Provannidae.

Description

Distribution
This marine species occurs off Point Loma, San Diego County, California, in seeps, vents and whale-falls.

References

 Warén A. & Bouchet P. (2001). Gastropoda and Monoplacophora from hydrothermal vents and seeps new taxa and records. The Veliger 44(2): 116–231

lomana
Gastropods described in 1918